Night Rhythms is a 1992 American erotic thriller film directed by Gregory Dark.

Plot
Nick West hosts a late night radio show where he gets multiple female callers to talk about their sex lives with him. One night, he has sex with a listener that invites herself to the station, but when he wakes up, he finds that the woman has been strangled to death, the killing having been broadcast on air. He must go on the run to prove his innocence, as he's accosted by mob boss Vincent and police officer Jackson, while helped only by his bartender friend Cinnamon and his show's producer Bridget.

Cast
Martin Hewitt as Nick West
David Carradine as Vincent
Sam J. Jones as Jackson
Deborah Driggs as Cinnamon
Delia Sheppard as Bridget
Tracy Tweed as Honey
 as Kit (as Jamie Stafford)
Patrice Leal as Lila
Julie Strain as Linda
Vinnie Curto as Joseph (as Vincent Curto)
Timothy C. Burns as Edgar
Juliet James as Sandra Mitchell
Stephen Fiachi as Cop
Theresa Ring as Roxanne
Kristine Rose as Marilyn
Carrie Bittner as Elaine
Erika Nann as Alex
Lisa Michelle Axelrod as Dancer (uncredited)
Carson Black as Mail Man (uncredited)

References

External links
 

1992 films
1990s erotic thriller films
American erotic thriller films
1992 thriller films
1990s English-language films
1990s American films
Films directed by Gregory Dark